Yuzhong County is a county of Gansu Province, China, it is under the administration of the prefecture-level city of Lanzhou, the capital of Gansu, one of 58 counties of Gansu. Its postal code is 730100, and its population in 2019 was 560,000 people.

History 
The history of Yuzhong County goes back to 214 BC. During the Jin Dynasty Yuzhong was a center of the Jincheng district located in the Yuzhong county (xian) in the Gansu province. Up to 1917 it was known as Jin County or Jinxian. Yuzhong has always had importance as the eastern gateway to Lanzhou. The historic Mingsu tomb (:zh:明肃王墓) is located in Yuzhong.

Geography 
The geography of Yuzhong is divided into the densely populated central valley of the Wanchuan River, flanked by forested mountains in the southwest, and arid mountains in the northeast.

Climate

Demographics 
Ethnic minorities form just 1% of the counties population, most of them are Hui.

Administrative divisions
Yuzhong County is divided to 11 towns and 9 townships.
Towns

Townships

It is proposed that Yuzhong will be upgraded to Yuzhong District.

Economy
Until April 2019, it was a designated poverty stricken county, however due to its favorable location near Lanzhou, along important transportation axes, the county has rapidly developed industry and services sectors.

Jiuquan Iron & Steel has a major steel plant in Yuzhong producing 1.3 million tons of steel annually.

Tourism
 Xinglongshan National Nature Reserve

Transport 
Highways
 G20 Qingdao–Yinchuan Expressway
 G30 Lianyungang–Khorgas Expressway
 G2501 Lanzhou Ring Expressway
 China National Highway 312
 China National Highway 309
Railways
 Baoji–Lanzhou high-speed railway (Yuzhong railway station)
 Longhai railway

The Chongqing–Lanzhou railway passes through Yuzhong county, but does not have any stations within the county. The Lanzhou Metro is proposed to be extended to Yuzhong.

Education

Educational institutes
Several institutes of higher learning have (one of) their campuses in Yuzhong county.
Xiaguanying town
 Northwest Minzu University
 Lanzhou University (undergraduate campus)
Heping town
 Lanzhou Jiaotong University
 Lanzhou University of Finance and Economics
 Lanzhou Vocational College of Foreign Languages

References

See also
 List of administrative divisions of Gansu

 
Yuzhong County
Geography of Lanzhou